Adur is a village in the southern state of Karnataka, India. It is located in the Sagara taluka of Shimoga district in Karnataka.

See also
 Shimoga
 Districts of Karnataka
 Mangalore

References

External links
 http://shimoga.nic.in/

Villages in Shimoga district